is a JR West railway station located in Hagi, Yamaguchi Prefecture, Japan.

Adjacent stations

Railway stations in Japan opened in 1925
Railway stations in Yamaguchi Prefecture
Sanin Main Line
Stations of West Japan Railway Company